Mogtédo, also spelt Mogtedo or Moktedo, is a town located in the province of Ganzourgou in Burkina Faso. The population of Mogtédo is 25,699, and it is the capital of Mogtédo Department.

References

External links
Satellite map at Maplandia.com

Populated places in the Plateau-Central Region
Ganzourgou Province